Rita Rocks is a Lifetime original sitcom that ran from 20 October 2008 to 7 December 2009. It was the network's first original comedy in over a decade. The series debuted alongside re-runs of Reba as part of a new comedy hour for Tuesday nights, which later changed to Monday nights. The show stars Nicole Sullivan as Rita, Tisha Campbell-Martin, Richard Ruccolo, Raviv Ullman, and Kelly Gould.

On 11 January 2010, Lifetime cancelled the series after two seasons due to low ratings.

Plot
A hard-working mom and wife splits her time between a job she doesn’t particularly like, running the kids around and managing the household. She believes that if she can just get a few hours a week to herself, she can figure a few things out. After finding her old guitar in the garage and the prompting of a new friend, they start up a weekly jam session and are joined by a neighbor, the mail-woman and her daughter’s boyfriend for nightly rehearsals. The plot is set in the Metropolitan Detroit area, most likely the Southfield area as Shannon attends Southfield Elementary School, which is shown throughout season 1.

In a February 2009 interview on Anytime with Bob Kushell, Sullivan agreed the main character is going through a midlife crisis, but she does not like using the term "midlife".

Characters

Main
Rita Clemens (Nicole Sullivan): a working mom with a busy life. She is the leader of a garage band and also the assistant manager of Bed Bath & Max. She was formerly training assistant before her boss learned of her pregnancy.
Jay Clemens (Richard Ruccolo): Rita’s husband who tries his best to support her band. He sometimes takes care of the household, getting himself into funny situations in the process.
Patty Mannix (Tisha Campbell-Martin): a postal worker and Rita's best friend who convinces her to take down her guitar and start the band.
Hallie Clemens (Natalie Dreyfuss): Rita's absent minded and rebellious teenage daughter.
Shannon Clemens (Kelly Gould): Rita's nine-year-old daughter. She goes to a school for gifted children and is interested in space camp and astronauts.
Kip (Raviv Ullman): Full name is Skip; Hallie's goofy and likable boyfriend/ex-boyfriend is the drummer in Rita's band. His parents are separated and he spends all of his time at the Clemens' household.
Max: Rita & Jay's new baby. Rita gave birth to him in the Season 2 finale.
Owen Delgado Jr. (Ian Gomez): Rita's unemployed neighbor who joins her garage band. He has two kids with wife Audrey. (left in 2009 to join Cougar Town).

Recurring
Audrey (Lauren Bowles): Owen's wife and mother of his two children who seems to love her job more than her own husband.
Chuck (Duane Martin): Rita's new neighbor, a former baseball player who is a huge annoyance to Rita and Jay. He and Patty (played by Duane Martin's wife Tisha Campbell-Martin) begin dating in late Season 2.
 Marilyn (Swoosie Kurtz): Rita's mother, who visits and stays for four episodes before leaving at Rita's request to talk to her father.
 Allison (Allie Gonino): Hallie's friend.
 Rusty (Paul Vato): the owner of the bowling alley where Rita's band performs publicly for the first time.

Episodes

Series overview

Season 1: 2008–09

Season 2: 2009

Home media
Rita Rocks: The Complete 1st Season was released on a 3-disc combo pack on April 27, 2010.

International broadcasting
 Arena TV in Australia airs the program.
 Citytv in Canada airs the program.
 STAR World in Asia airs the program.
 Fox Life in Poland, Turkey, Greece, Portugal, Bulgaria, Bosnia and Herzegovina, Croatia and Serbia airs the program.
 SKY Uno in Italy is going to air in autumn 2009.
 NET 5 in the Netherlands airs the program
 TNT Serie in Germany airs the program.
 Comédie! in France, Belgium and Switzerland will air the sitcom in 2010.
 Yes Comedy in Israel airs the program.
 TV4 Komedi in Sweden airs the program.
 MTV3 in Finland airs the program.

References

External links

Rita Rocks at Mylifetime.com

2008 American television series debuts
2009 American television series endings
2000s American sitcoms
English-language television shows
Lifetime (TV network) original programming
Television shows set in Detroit
Television series by Media Rights Capital
Midlife crisis in television